The  is a mountain within the German state of Hesse. Great advances in sailplane development took place on the mountain during the interwar period, driven by annual contests. Near the summit there is still an airfield used by gliding clubs and pilots of light aircraft.

Etymology 
The German name is derived from Wasenkuppe, Asenberg or Weideberg and means Pasture mountain.

Geography 
Other villages nearby are Poppenhausen ( west - south west) and Wüstensachsen ( east, part of Ehrenberg, Hesse). It is part of the Rhön Biosphere Reserve.

The Wasserkuppe sources the spring of the river Fulda (the western source of the Weser) and the river Lütter which joins the Fulda after .

The other peaks near the Wasserkuppe are Abtsrodaer Kuppe (north,  NN),  (east,  NN) and Pferdskopf (south west,  NN).

Aeronautical development
Students from the Darmstadt University of Technology, then known as Technische Hochschule Darmstadt, began flying gliders from the Wasserkuppe as early as 1911, but interest in gliding in Germany increased greatly after 1918 when the Treaty of Versailles restricted the production or use of powered aircraft in the nation. From 1920 onwards, annual gliding competitions were held, leading to records being set and broken for height, distance and duration of unpowered flight. In 1922  became the first glider pilot to use an updraft rising along a mountain slope to stay aloft for a lengthy period. He then founded the world's first glider pilot school at the Wasserkuppe.

The first competition was organised by Oskar Ursinus, who also built the first clubhouse on the Wasserkuppe in 1924 to replace the shipping containers that enthusiasts were using as accommodation up to that point. By 1930, the competition had become an international event, drawing pilots from all over Europe and even the United States.

Also in 1924 'Rhönvater' (Rhön father) Oskar Ursinus convinced the then secretary of air transport for the ministry of transportation  to turn the new gliding club into a state funded research organization. This started the Rhön-Rossitten Gesellschaft and as a result, the Wasserkuppe now had a gliding school, workshops for building gliders and a funded research facility. Alexander Lippisch was appointed as the managing director of the new society.

Virtually every German aeronautical engineer and test pilot of note during the 1920s and 1930s spent time building, testing, and flying aircraft at the Wasserkuppe, including the Günter brothers, Wolf Hirth, the Horten brothers, Robert Kronfeld, Hans Jacobs, Heini Dittmar, Alexander Lippisch, Willy Messerschmitt, Hanna Reitsch, Peter Riedel, and Alexander Schleicher. Beverley Shenstone, who was later a key part of the design team for the Spitfire, flew gliders at Wasserkuppe in 1930. This period saw great advances in new technologies such as flying wings and rocket-powered flights.

In the 1930s the "Ehrenhalle" (Hall of Honor) was constructed in the Lilienthal Haus, with heavy bronze doors opening into a large hall with a stained glass window. The centerpiece is a larger-than-life bronze figure of Otto Lilienthal lying on an (empty) tomb. It is a memorial to all pilots who have died in aviation accidents. The inscription on the memorial is Lilienthal's famous last words: "Opfer müssen gebracht werden" roughly meaning: "Sacrifices must be made."

In Nazi Germany, gliding activities became largely controlled by the state, and for Hitler Youth pilots and their instructors, proficiency in gliding was viewed as the first step towards the Luftwaffe. Sailplane research was also nationalised under the Deutsche Forschungsanstalt für Segelflug (DFSGerman Research Institute for Sailplane Flight).

Following World War II, a US Air Force base, radar station, and surveillance station were established there but when restrictions on German aviation were lifted in 1951, gliding soon returned to the Wasserkuppe where it has remained popular since. Beginning in the 1970s, the newer sport of hang gliding has also found a home there. Following the reunification of Germany and demise of the Soviet Union, the surveillance and radar installations were removed in the 1990s.

In 1970, to commemorate the 50th anniversary of the first competition, the Deutsches Segelflugmuseum (German Sailplane Museum) was opened on the plateau, with Neil Armstrong a guest of honour at the ceremony. The museum gained a new building in 1987. The Wasserkuppe is also the home of the Oldtimer Segelflugclub (OSC – Oldtimer Gliding Club), dedicated (as its name suggests) to flying vintage sailplanes.

Next to the long tradition of sailplanes the Wasserkuppe has become a sports and weekend centre offering a wide selection of activities. Paragliding as well as Snowkiting is offered. In winter the area is used by skiers and snowboarders.

See also 
 RRG Fafnir
 RRG Professor
 RRG Urubu Obs
 Rhön-Rossitten Gesellschaft
 Stratobowl, a similar bowl-shaped natural landform in the United States, associated with historic aviation activity

References

External links 
 
 Oldtimer Segelflugclub (in German)
 Pilot school at the Wasserkuppe (in German)
 hourly updated Webcam picture of the Airfield at the Wasserkuppe (EDER) taken from pilot schools webpages

Gliding in Germany
Mountains of Hesse
Mountains and hills of the Rhön
Mountains under 1000 metres